Gelu Radu (born 3 November 1957) is a retired Romanian featherweight  weightlifter. He won a silver medal at the 1984 Olympics and a bronze at the 1983 World Championships.

References

1957 births
Living people
Olympic weightlifters of Romania
Weightlifters at the 1984 Summer Olympics
Weightlifters at the 1980 Summer Olympics
Olympic silver medalists for Romania
Olympic medalists in weightlifting
Medalists at the 1984 Summer Olympics
World Weightlifting Championships medalists
Romanian male weightlifters
20th-century Romanian people
21st-century Romanian people